"Wobble Up" is a song recorded by American singer Chris Brown featuring rappers Nicki Minaj and G-Eazy. It was released on April 18, 2019, as the third single from Brown's ninth studio album Indigo, (2019)

Background
The song heavily samples "Monkey on tha D$ck" by the late Cash Money Records rap artist Magnolia Shorty. It is Chris Brown's seventh collaboration with Nicki Minaj and third with G-Eazy, and the first between Minaj and G-Eazy.

"Wobble Up" is about twerking (hence the term "wobble") in which Brown and G-Eazy rap from the male point of view patronizing female dancers at the club, though Brown also provides insight to the girl's struggles while trying to impress men, while Minaj raps from the female point of view having dealt with enough men "stunting on [her]" at the club but shouts out to her "real niggas".

Music video
Chris Brown released the music video for the song on May 20, 2019. American rapper Tyga and internet celebrity Dan Rue make cameos in the video. The video is directed by Brown and Arrad Rahgoshay. The following day, the team behind the video were accused by German artist Marius Sperlich  for stealing and copying his artwork.

Credits and personnel
Credits adapted from Tidal.

 J.R. Rotem – production, lyrics
 Chris Brown – vocals, lyrics
 Nicki Minaj – vocals, lyrics
 G-Eazy – vocals, lyrics
 Magnolia Shorty – lyrics
 Billie Calvin – lyrics
 Theron Thomas – lyrics
 Byron O. Thomas – lyrics
 Randy Merrill – mastering engineer
 Ben "Bengineer" Chang – assistant engineer
 Patrizio Pigliapoco – mixing, recording engineer
 Aubry "Big Juice" Delaine – misc. producer

Charts

Weekly charts

Year-end charts

Certifications

References

2019 singles
Chris Brown songs
Nicki Minaj songs
Songs written by J. R. Rotem
Song recordings produced by J. R. Rotem
G-Eazy songs
Songs written by G-Eazy
Songs written by Nicki Minaj
Songs written by Chris Brown
Songs written by Mannie Fresh
RCA Records singles